Several legislative bodies in German-speaking countries have been called Abgeordnetenhaus:
 Abgeordnetenhaus of Berlin, state parliament for the State of Berlin, Germany
 Abgeordnetenhaus (Prussia) (1850–1918), one of two parliamentary chambers for the Kingdom of Prussia
 Abgeordnetenhaus (Austria) (1867–1918), one of two chambers in the Austrian Imperial Council (Reichsrat) parliament

See also
 House of Representatives